KCMN-LD, virtual channel 42 (UHF digital channel 28), is a television station licensed to Topeka, Kansas, United States. The station is owned by HC2 Holdings, as part of a duopoly with KAJF-LD (channel 21, also licensed to Topeka).

Although the city of license is Topeka, the station's signal does not reach that city; for its transmitter, which is shared with KAJF-LD, is located on the southeastern side of Kansas City just off 58th Street near the exit 65 interchange of Interstate 435. It now identifies itself as a Kansas City-based station rather than in its licensed city.

History
The Federal Communications Commission issued the construction permit for the station, under the calls of K38MN-D, on February 22, 2011. The current callsign was adopted on December 4, 2015. Upon signing on in summer 2016, the station became DTV America's second low-power station in the Kansas City area as they signed on KAJF-LD sometime before. KCMN became DTV America's third Kansas-licensed station after locally based KAJF and Pittsburg, Kansas-licensed KPJO-LP in the Joplin, Missouri area.

In April 2017, Cheddar news channel started broadcasting over the air with DTV America affiliating five stations including KCMN with the network. Dunkin' Donuts, a Cheddar advertiser, was handing out free digital antennas at events in the stations' markets to publicize the over the air launch.

Digital channels
The station's digital signal is multiplexed:

References

External links
DTV America

 
 
 

Innovate Corp.
Decades (TV network) affiliates
Heroes & Icons affiliates
Stadium (sports network) affiliates
Low-power television stations in the United States
CMN
CMN
Television channels and stations established in 2016
2016 establishments in Kansas